In mathematics, essential dimension is an invariant defined for certain algebraic structures such as algebraic groups and quadratic forms. It was introduced by J. Buhler and Z. Reichstein
and in its most generality defined by A. Merkurjev.

Basically, essential dimension measures the complexity of algebraic structures via their fields of definition. For example, a quadratic form q : V → K over a field K, where V is a K-vector space, is said to be defined over a subfield L of K if there exists a K-basis e1,...,en of V such that q can be expressed in the form  with all coefficients aij belonging to L. If K has characteristic different from 2, every quadratic form is diagonalizable. Therefore, q has a field of definition generated by n elements. Technically, one always works over a (fixed) base field k and the fields K and L in consideration are supposed to contain k. The essential dimension of q is then defined as the least transcendence degree over k of a subfield L of K over which q is defined.

Formal definition
Fix an arbitrary field k and let /k denote the category of finitely generated field extensions of k with inclusions as morphisms. Consider a (covariant) functor F : /k → .
For a field extension K/k and an element a of F(K/k) a field of definition of a is an intermediate field K/L/k such that a is contained in the image of the map F(L/k) → F(K/k) induced by the inclusion of L in K.

The essential dimension of a, denoted by ed(a), is the least transcendence degree (over k) of a field of definition for a. The essential dimension of the functor F, denoted by ed(F), is the supremum of ed(a) taken over all elements a of F(K/k) and objects K/k of /k.

Examples
 Essential dimension of quadratic forms: For a natural number n consider the functor Qn : /k →  taking a field extension K/k to the set of isomorphism classes of non-degenerate n-dimensional quadratic forms over K and taking a morphism L/k → K/k (given by the inclusion of L in K) to the map sending the isomorphism class of a quadratic form q : V → L to the isomorphism class of the quadratic form .
 Essential dimension of algebraic groups: For an algebraic group G over k denote by H1(−,G) : /k →  the functor taking a field extension K/k to the set of isomorphism classes of G-torsors over K (in the fppf-topology). The essential dimension of this functor is called the essential dimension of the algebraic group G, denoted by ed(G).
 Essential dimension of a fibered category: Let  be a category fibered over the category  of affine k-schemes, given by a functor  For example,  may be the moduli stack  of genus g curves or the classifying stack  of an algebraic group. Assume that for each  the isomorphism classes of objects in the fiber p−1(A) form a set. Then we get a functor Fp : /k →  taking a field extension K/k to the set of isomorphism classes in the fiber . The essential dimension of the fibered category  is defined as the essential dimension of the corresponding functor Fp. In case of the classifying stack  of an algebraic group G the value coincides with the previously defined essential dimension of G.

Known results

 The essential dimension of a linear algebraic group G is always finite and bounded by the minimal dimension of a generically free representation minus the dimension of G.  
 The essential dimension of a finite algebraic p-group over k equals the minimal dimension of a faithful representation, provided that the base field k contains a primitive p-th root of unity.
 The essential dimension of the symmetric group Sn (viewed as algebraic group over k) is known for n ≤ 5 (for every base field k), for n = 6 (for k of characteristic not 2) and for n = 7 (in characteristic 0).
 Let T be an algebraic torus admitting a Galois splitting field L/k of degree a power of a prime p. Then the essential dimension of T equals the least rank of the kernel of a homomorphism of Gal(L/k)-lattices P → X(T) with cokernel finite and of order coprime to p, where P is a permutation lattice.

References

Algebraic structures